Kevin Kelly (born  May 27, 1990) is a  Dutch professional baseball pitcher for Curaçao Neptunus of the Honkbal Hoofdklasse. He played college baseball at Western Oklahoma State College and Southwestern Oklahoma State University.

Kelly was chosen as a member of the Netherlands national baseball team for the 2010 Central American and Caribbean Games, 2011 World Port Tournament, 2013 World Port Tournament, 2014 Haarlem Baseball Week, 2015 World Port Tournament 2016 exhibition games against Japan, and 2017 World Baseball Classic

Kelly signed with the Rimini Baseball Club of the Italian Baseball League for the 2018 season. He played for Team Netherlands in the 2019 European Baseball Championship, at the Africa/Europe 2020 Olympic Qualification tournament in Italy in September 2019, and at the 2019 WBSC Premier12.

References

External links

1983 births
Living people
Competitors at the 2010 Central American and Caribbean Games
Curaçao expatriate baseball players in Italy
Curaçao expatriate baseball players in the United States
Curacao Neptunus players
DOOR Neptunus players
People from Willemstad
Rimini Baseball Club players
Southwestern Oklahoma State Bulldogs baseball players
Western Oklahoma State Pioneers baseball players
2016 European Baseball Championship players
2017 World Baseball Classic players
2019 European Baseball Championship players
2023 World Baseball Classic players